Westminster College is a private college in Fulton, Missouri. It was established in 1851 as Fulton College. America's National Churchill Museum (formerly the Winston Churchill Memorial and Library) is a national historic site located on campus. The school enrolled 609 students in 2020.

History

1851 – 1999
Westminster College was founded as a college for young men by the Rev. William W. Robertson and local Presbyterians in 1851 as Fulton College and assumed the present name in 1853. Throughout the next century, Westminster College continued to be an all-male institution until the first coeducational class in 1979.

In 1909, the original Westminster Hall was destroyed by fire, leaving only the six Corinthian columns which helped support it. Since then, the Columns have been restored and serve as a symbolic rite of passage for new and graduating students. During the convocation ceremony at the beginning of students' first year, students walk through the columns towards the campus, and then back through towards Westminster Avenue after their graduation ceremony at the end of their senior year.

Westminster College was the site of former United Kingdom Prime Minister Winston Churchill's famous "Sinews of Peace" speech in 1946. Less than one year after the end of World War II, Churchill lectured about the state of world political affairs, notably regarding the growing tension in Europe during the prelude to the Cold War. 

In 1969, Westminster College dedicated one of its most recognizable landmarks – the Church of St. Mary the Virgin, Aldermanbury. Originally built in the City of London in the 12th century, it was destroyed during the Great Fire of London in 1666. It was rebuilt by Christopher Wren in 1677, and then was gutted by the Blitz in 1940. It stayed in London until 1966, when it was transported stone by stone to Fulton and reassembled on the Westminster College campus. The undercroft of the Church is now home to America's National Churchill Museum.

Also in 1969, Westminster College became independent of the Presbyterian Church, but it continues to maintain a loose affiliation today with the Presbyterian Church (USA).

2000 – Present
The endowment grew from $27 million in 2000 to its current $57.1 million. Westminster began offering online classes in 2011. The Churchill Institute for Global Engagement was created in 2013 to further global education with new academic programs and global initiatives. This period also saw the establishment of new corporate and academic partnerships, including dual-degree program agreements with Washington University in St. Louis, Logan University College of Chiropractic, Missouri University of Science and Technology, Goldfarb School of Nursing at Barnes-Jewish College, and Culver–Stockton College.

Presidents
From its founding in 1851 through 1854 and again from 1861 to 1864, the college was overseen by the chairmanship of the faculty, which rotated among faculty members, instead of a president. The following have served as presidents of Westminster College:

 Rev. Samuel S. Laws, 1855–1861
 Rev. John Montgomery, 1864–1865
 Rev. Michael Montgomery Fisher, 1865–1868 (acting)
 Dr. Nathan L. Rice, 1868–1874
 Rev. Michael Montgomery Fisher, 1875–1877
 Rev. Charles Campbell Hersman, 1878–1887
 Rev. William Hoge Marquess, 1888–1892
 Edward Clifford Gordon, 1894–1897 (interim)
 John Jay Rice, 1898–1899 (interim)
 Dr. John Henry McCracken, 1899–1903
 John Jay Rice, 1903–1904 (interim)
 Rev. David Ramsey Kerr, 1904–1911
 Rev. Charles Brasee Boving, 1912–1914
 John Jay Rice, 1914–1915 (interim)
 Rev. Elmer Ellsworth Reed, 1915–1926
 Dr. Marion Edmund Melvin, 1927–1933
 Dr. Franc Lewis McCluer, 1934–1946
 Rev. William Webster Hall, 1947–1954
 Robert L. D. Davidson, 1955–1973
 Dale Purcell, 1973–1976
 William L. Stucker, 1976–1977 (interim)
 John Harvey Saunders, 1977–1992
 John E. "Jack" Marshall, 1992–1993 (interim)
 James F. Traer, 1993–1999
 Neal Creighton, 1999–2000 (interim)
 Fletcher M. Lamkin, 2000–2007
 George B. "Barney" Forsythe, 2007–2015
 Benjamin Ola. Akande, 2015–2017
 Carolyn Perry, 2017 (acting)
 Fletcher M. Lamkin, 2017–2020
 Donald P. Lofe, 2020–present

Academics 
Academic Divisions and Departments include Humanities, Natural and Mathematical Sciences, and Social Sciences. The college offers 29 majors, 39 minors, 3 specialty programs, and 4 dual-degree programs. Westminster's Cadaver Program, which began as a small independent study in the fall of 2005, is offered for pre-med, biology, and psychology students who can explore the anatomy of the human body through scientific dissection.

Accreditations 
Westminster College is a member of the Higher Learning Commission (HLC) and is regionally accredited by HLC. Westminster College's business program is accredited by the Accreditation Council for Business Schools & Programs (ACBSP); Westminster College's education program is accredited by the Missouri Department of Secondary Education (DESE).

Special programs  
Westminster offers special programs in Health Professions and Legal Professions. An Honors Program is offered for high-achieving students.

Pre-Professional programs and academic partnerships 
Pre-professional programs/academic partnerships at Westminster are Dual-Degree Engineering with Washington University in St. Louis or Missouri University of Science and Technology, Dual-Degree Nursing with the Goldfarb School of Nursing at Barnes-Jewish College, Dual-Degree Chiropractic with Logan University College of Chiropractic, and most recently a 3+2 accelerated Master of Athletic Training program with Culver–Stockton College. Westminster has also partnered with Ameren UE in Missouri and Illinois to offer continuing education and degree completion programs for the Ameren's employees.

Mentoring program and seminar
All incoming students are provided with two seminar mentors and a seminar professor who will advise students throughout their years at Westminster College. To make the transition from high school to college easier, mentors help orient students to their new life at Westminster and provide guidance in the areas of academics, social and residential life.

Campus lectures 
Since Winston Churchill delivered his "Iron Curtain" speech on campus, Westminster consistently attracts world leaders through its variety of campus lectures. Included among the speakers are senators, former presidents, current or retired generals, admirals, and intelligence officers. Past and recent speakers include former Presidents Gerald Ford, George H.W. Bush, and Ronald Reagan; former Soviet President Mikhail Gorbechev; Jeh Johnson, former U.S. Secretary of Homeland Security; U.S. Senator Bernie Sanders; and former U.S. Secretary of State Madeleine Albright.

Campus

The Westminster College Historic District was added to the National Register of Historic Places in 1982. It encompasses nine contributing buildings and six contributing objects.  They include the Hall of Science (1900–1901), Steam Heating Plant (1919–1920), The Columns ("Old" Westminster Hall) (1853–1854), Westminster Hall (1909–1911), the Gymnasium (1928), Swope Chapel Memorial (1967), Washington West House (1907), Re-Union Hall (1903), and Reeves Library (1950–1951).

Historic Westminster Gymnasium

The Gym was built in 1928 and completely renovated in 1972. This national historic landmark is where Winston Churchill presented his "Iron Curtain" speech in March 1946. Vice President Dick Cheney also visited the college during the 2004 campaign and spoke in the Gym. When new bleachers were installed, the old bleachers were recycled into new lockers for the men's and women's locker rooms. The floor has been renamed for Henry "Hank" Iba, Class of 1927, who was an all-state basketball, football, and baseball player at Westminster before going on to coach Oklahoma State University to two national basketball titles and the U.S. Olympics basketball team to two gold medals. The Gym houses a basketball/volleyball court, athletic offices, and an exercise room. It also housed an indoor swimming pool until 2016.

Westminster Hall
This hall was built in 1911 and renovated in 1973–74. It is the main administrative building on campus and houses the Business Office, the Registrar, and Dean of Faculty offices, along with two classrooms. The lower-level houses Westminster's Wellness Center (Health and Counseling Services) and the Tomnitz Family Learning Opportunities Center.

The Columns
These columns are the only remains of the first Westminster Hall built in 1854 and destroyed by fire in 1909. These Columns are the center of a campus tradition, the Columns Ceremony.

Newnham Hall
It was originally built in 1901 and is the oldest building on campus.  It was completely renovated and remodeled in early 1970 as a gift of an alumnus.

Reeves Library and the Student Success Center
Reeves Library was built in 1951 and expanded & renovated in 1981 and again in 1996. In 2020, the library grew to incorporate a new Student Success Center. The building houses a collection of more than 100,000 volumes readily available in-house for students and faculty. It is a member of the statewide consortium of 50 academic libraries. The Hazel Wing was dedicated in October 1996 and serves as the technological center on the campus, housing four computer labs, video editing equipment, a multimedia classroom, a language lab, small group meeting, and study rooms as well as offices for the Department of Information Technology. With the addition of the Student Success Center, various student services were brought under one roof, including the Greg Richard Office of Advising and Career Development, a gift from an alumnus and former trustee; the Office of Global Educational Services; and the WCares Program.

Hunter Activity Center
Otherwise known as the "HAC", this building is a common area for both faculty and students. Downstairs is the Johnson College Inn (known to students as "JCI") grill/snack bar which is surrounded by ping-pong tables, pool tables, campus mailboxes, and the TV lounge. Upstairs houses meeting rooms and the HAC Gym. Westminster's HAC Gym includes a racquetball court, indoor track, weight equipment, and workout room and is the site for most intramural sports.

Coulter Science Center
This building was renovated in 2004 with an $18 million gift from the Wallace H. Coulter Foundation. Otherwise known as "CSC," this is where science classes and labs such as chemistry, biology, physics, psychology, environmental science, computer science, and math are held. This building is complete with computer labs on every floor. Westminster faculty were asked to provide their input before architects were hired to draw up the plans. The focus is totally on students and how to create a better learning atmosphere and to offer rooms for student research on a large scale.

Champ Auditorium
This large building was built in 1966 and seats 1,400 people for concerts, lectures, music productions, and other college events such as commencement and Freshmen Convocation. A wide variety of notable individuals have spoken at Champ Auditorium since the building's completion, including rock musician and global humanitarian Bob Geldof, former U.S. Secretary of Homeland Security Jeh Johnson, Sen. Bernie Sanders, and former U.S. Secretary of State Madeleine Albright.

Breakthrough 
Breakthrough is a sculpture consisting of eight sections of the Berlin Wall. It commemorates the collapse of the Iron Curtain and the end of the Cold War. The sculpture is the work of artist Edwina Sandys, granddaughter of Winston Churchill. It was dedicated to Westminster College in 1990 by former President Ronald Reagan. It is the longest contiguous section of the Berlin Wall in North America.

Church of St. Mary the Virgin, Aldermanbury

This predecessor of this church building was originally constructed London during the 12th century, but burned down in the Great Fire of London in 1666. This church was erected as its replacement by Christopher Wren in the 17th century. During World War II, the Wren church was gutted by German bombs and in the mid-1960s, it was dismantled and shipped stone by stone to Fulton and reconstructed on Westminster's campus. Today, the church serves as the college's chapel. While it is occasionally claimed that St. Mary's is the oldest church in North America, the statement is not accurate. The transported Wren building is not the original 12th Century building of the St. Mary Aldermanbury parish of London. It is instead the replacement that was built under Wren's direction between 1672 and 1677, containing a single set of stairs from the medieval period, being an almost entirely new construction made largely of Portland stone that Wren had quarried in Dorset. This would make it considerably newer than such ancient North American buildings as the church of San Francisco in Tlaxcala, Mexico, whose construction began in 1521.

America's National Churchill Museum

Located below the Church of St. Mary the Virgin, Aldermanbury, this state-of-the-art museum is devoted to Sir Winston Churchill. In 2005, the building underwent a $4 million renovation and reopened in March 2006, marking the 60th anniversary of Churchill's speech at Westminster. This museum features interactive exhibits about Churchill, World War II, Sir Christopher Wren, and the Church of St. Mary, the Virgin, Aldermanbury. The Museum also showcases traveling and temporary exhibits, archival resources for scholarly research, and a gift shop with unique "Churchillian" merchandise.

Residential life
Westminster College manages and maintains nine residence halls as well as a limited number of residential homes for student occupancy. In addition, the six national fraternities for men operate their own independent living units. New students are generally assigned to Gage, Marquess, Rice, Scott, and Sloss Halls, which compose the Churchill Quadrangle. Westminster's upper-class students live either in one of the four upper-class residence halls (Emerson, Wetterau, Weigle, Sweazey), Westminster Apartments, an on-campus residential house, Westminster Townhouses, or a national fraternity house. Members of Westminster's national sororities live in designated floors of three residence halls.

Student life

Clubs and Organizations
Westminster students can pick from over 50 clubs and organizations to become involved in on campus. Honorary societies include: Alpha Chi, Alpha Mu Gamma, Beta Beta Beta, FMA National Honor Society, Gamma Theta Upsilon, Kappa Delta Pi, Omicron Delta Kappa, Phi Alpha Delta, Phi Alpha Theta, Pi Mu Epsilon, Psi Chi, Phi Sigma Alpha, Phi Sigma Tau, Sigma Tau Delta, and Theta Alpha Kappa.

Greek life
Westminster College has a well-established history of Greek Life, dating to 1868. Approximately 47% of students are members of Greek organizations. Participation in this heritage has afforded students opportunities in leadership and involvement, both on-campus and within the greater Fulton community. Greek life consists of six national fraternities and three national sororities. Fraternities and sororities receive national recognition for the successful organizations that have been formed and maintained over the last 150 years.

Fraternities
Sigma Alpha Epsilon
Kappa Alpha Order
Beta Theta Pi
Phi Delta Theta
Delta Tau Delta
Sigma Chi

Sororities
 Alpha Gamma Delta
 Kappa Alpha Theta
 Kappa Kappa Gamma

Athletics
The Westminster athletic teams are called the Blue Jays. The college is a member of the Division III level of the National Collegiate Athletic Association (NCAA), primarily competing in the St. Louis Intercollegiate Athletic Conference (SLIAC) since the 1990–91 academic year. The Blue Jays previously competed in the Missouri College Athletic Union (MCAU) of the National Association of Intercollegiate Athletics (NAIA) from 1924–25 to 1931–32. The school mascot is the blue jay.

Westminster competes in 18 intercollegiate varsity sports: Men's sports include baseball, basketball, cross country, football, golf, soccer, tennis, track & field and wrestling; while women's sports include basketball, cross country, golf, soccer, softball, tennis, track & field, volleyball and wrestling. Former sports included co-ed cheerleading.

Notable alumni 

 Joe Aull
 Ewald W. Busse
 W. Bruce Cameron Class of '78, author A Dog's Purpose
 Courtney W. Campbell
 Wallace H. Coulter
 William Henry Danforth, Chancellor of Washington University in St. Louis and philanthropist
 Forrest DeBernardi
 Bill Emerson
 G. David Gearhart
 Michael Gibbons, former President Pro Tem of Missouri State Senate
 Julian Wood Glass Jr., United States District Judge of the United States District Court for the Eastern District of Missouri
 George F. Gunn Jr.
 Paul K. Holmes III
 Henry Iba, American basketball coach and college athletics administrator
 Michael Kim
 Ian Mackey, class of 2009, member of the Missouri General Assembly
 Bake McBride from Fulton, NL Rookie of the Year 1974
 Edward Howard Payne, namesake of Howard Payne University 
 Edward D. Robertson Jr.
 Tony F. Schneider
 Scott Shipp was the second superintendent of the Virginia Military Institute and a Confederate officer
 Alfred C. Sikes, former U.S. administrator of the National Telecommunications and Information Administration, who served as chairman of the Federal Communications Commission (FCC)
 Scott Pingel
 Forrest Smith
 Thomas Starzl
 Howard Sutherland
 John Van Sant, Pennsylvania State Representative and State Senator
 Harry Vaughan, U.S. Army Reserve general who served as Aide to the President of the United States from 1945 to 1953
 Oberon Zell-Ravenheart

References

External links

 
 Official athletics website
 War Comes to Westminster College: Missouri's Civil War at Historical Marker Database

 
1851 establishments in Missouri
Buildings and structures in Callaway County, Missouri
Colonial Revival architecture in Missouri
Education in Callaway County, Missouri
Educational institutions established in 1851
Former Mid-America Intercollegiate Athletics Association schools
Historic districts on the National Register of Historic Places in Missouri
Liberal arts colleges in Missouri
Neoclassical architecture in Missouri
Private universities and colleges in Missouri
St. Louis Intercollegiate Athletic Conference schools
Tourist attractions in Callaway County, Missouri
Universities and colleges affiliated with the Presbyterian Church (USA)
University and college buildings on the National Register of Historic Places in Missouri